The following is a list of football stadiums in Suriname, ordered by capacity.

See also
List of football clubs in Suriname
List of South American stadiums by capacity
List of association football stadiums by capacity

References

 
Suriname
stadiums
Football stadiums